Pruthvi Ambaar is an Indian actor who works in Kannada and Tulu films. He started his career as a radio jockey. His performance in the Kannada film Dia (2020) gained him recognition.

Career
Ambaar started his career as a radio presenter in Mangaluru. In the initial days of his career, he directed and acted in many short films. He was known as RJ Nagaraj. He made his debut entry as an actor in the Tulu film Barke in 2014.

In the same year, he had a lead role in the film Pilibail Yamunakka along with Sonal Monteiro, directed by K Sooraj Shetty. It was a hit for the Tulu film industry. Later he acted in many Tulu and Kannada films.

Filmography

Film

Television

Awards and nominations

References 

Indian male film actors
Kannada male actors
1988 births
Living people
21st-century Indian male actors
South Indian International Movie Awards winners
Santosham Film Awards winners
Male actors in Kannada cinema
Male actors in Hindi cinema
Male actors in Tulu cinema
Male actors in Kannada television
Indian male television actors
Indian soap opera actors
People from Udupi
Male actors from Karnataka